Lorenzo Marchionni (born August 17, 1994) is an Italian football midfielder.

Career

Marchionni began his footballing career with Ascoli, and in 2010 summer he was loaned to Juventus.

However, after a full season with Juve's Primavera squad, he returned to Ascoli. Marchionni made his first team debut on 14 August 2011, in Coppa Italia victory against Taranto.

In July 2016 Marchionni was signed by Lega Pro club Pro Piacenza.

References

External links
 
 

1994 births
Living people
People from Ascoli Piceno
Italian footballers
Association football midfielders
Serie B players
Ascoli Calcio 1898 F.C. players
Juventus F.C. players
A.S. Gubbio 1910 players
Modena F.C. players
Sportspeople from the Province of Ascoli Piceno
Footballers from Marche